Lake Parker, is located in the northwest corner of West Glover, Orleans County, Vermont in an area known as the Northeast Kingdom. The lake is fed by two primary streams and outlets into Roaring Brook, which empties into the Barton River, Lake Memphremagog and, eventually, Canada's St. Lawrence River. It is bordered on three sides by seasonal homes; the southern end is a natural estuary sheltering waterfowl. The surrounding land is farmed for raising dairy cattle.

External links
 Lake Parker Association

Lakes of Vermont
Lakes of Orleans County, Vermont